Amanda Carr (born 3 October 1990) plays for Great Britain women's national ice hockey team as defenceplayer.

References

1990 births
Living people
English women's ice hockey players